Pondfield Cove is a small, secluded, south-facing cove immediately to the east of Worbarrow Tout and west of Gad Cliff on the south coast of the Isle of Purbeck, in Dorset, England.

The cove is only accessible when the Lulworth Ranges are open to the public. It can be reached either by a  walk down an easy track alongside Tyneham Gwyle, from the car park alongside the ghost village of Tyneham, or alternatively via the South West Coast Path.

Geology 

The geology of the Isle of Purbeck is very complex and this is shown very clearly along this stretch of coast. The extreme angular layers of rock visibly demonstrate the complex sedimentary folding that affected this area some 30 million years ago. The foldings were caused by the tectonic pressures as the African and European continents collided.

During this period, the sediments were twisted horizontally, this is why the younger Cretaceous formations, between 85 and 145 million years old, are found to the rear of Worbarrow Bay. Pondfield Cove lies entirely within the Portland limestones, 150 million, and Purbeck Beds, 147 million years old. The sequence of Purbeck limestones and shales is clearly visible within the low neck of land between Worbarrow Tout and the mainland. This cliff face separates the cove from Worbarrow Bay to the north.

See also 
 List of Dorset beaches

References

Gallery

Isle of Purbeck
Jurassic Coast
Coves of Dorset